Kelly Foster may refer to:

Kelly Foster, character in Revolution (TV series)
Kelly Foster, character in Virus (1999 film)
Kelly Foster, character in We Bought a Zoo